Nancy Vonderheide (born c.1939 in Cincinnati, Ohio, United States), later Nancy Kleinman, was a World Champion archer who represented the United States.

Vonderheide took up archery in 1959 after starting to date Marvin Kleinman, a partner at the legal firm she was working at, who was a keen archer. Within two years, she won the World Championships in Oslo as an unknown; she also set two new world records at the event. She went on to carry out a record-breaking 16 competition unbeaten streak, before being upset at the 1963 Championships by compatriot Victoria Cook. She was not selected for the United States team for any future Championships.

Nancy Kleinman died on March 11, 2017, after a long illness.

References

2017 deaths
American female archers
World Archery Championships medalists
1930s births
21st-century American women